Mukah is a federal constituency in Mukah Division (Mukah District & Dalat District), Sarawak, Malaysia, that has been represented in the Dewan Rakyat since 1971.

The federal constituency was created in the 1968 redistribution and is mandated to return a single member to the Dewan Rakyat under the first past the post voting system.

Demographics 
https://ge15.orientaldaily.com.my/seats/sarawak/p

History

Polling districts 
According to the gazette issued on 31 October 2022, the Mukah constituency has a total of 45 polling districts.

Representation history

State constituency

Current state assembly members

Local governments

Election results

References

Sarawak federal constituencies